Goričica is a settlement in the Municipality of Šentjur, in eastern Slovenia. The settlement, and the municipality, are included in the Savinja Statistical Region, which is in the Slovenian portion of the historical Duchy of Styria.

References

External links

Goričica at Geopedia

Populated places in the Municipality of Šentjur